The 2009 IIHF World Championship Division III was an international ice hockey tournament run by the International Ice Hockey Federation. The tournament was contested on April 10–16, 2009 in Dunedin, New Zealand. Mongolia withdrew from the tournament and therefore forfeited all of their games.

Venue

All matches were contested at the Dunedin Ice Stadium, St. Kilda, Dunedin. This venue is the home ice of the Dunedin Thunder ice hockey team. The Dunedin Ice Stadium was used later the same month for the 2009 World Senior Curling Championships.

Participants

Fixtures
All times are local (UTC+12).

Ranking and statistics

Tournament Awards
Best players selected by the directorate:
Best Goaltender:  Ntalimpor Ploutsis
Best Defenceman:  Gokturk Tasdemir
Best Forward:  Brett Speirs

Scoring leaders
List shows the top skaters sorted by points, then goals. If the list exceeds 10 skaters because of a tie in points, all of the tied skaters are left out.

Source: IIHF.com

Leading goaltenders
Only the top five goaltenders, based on save percentage, who have played 40% of their team's minutes are included in this list.
Source: IIHF.com

References

External links
 Division III fixtures and statistics at IIHF
 
 

2009
4
2009 in New Zealand sport
2009 in Turkish sport
2009 in Greek sport
2009 in Irish sport
2009